The Lee Shay Farmhouse, also known as the Lee Shay Farmstead, is a historic residence located in rural Ringgold County, Iowa, United States near the town of Maloy.  Joseph Leo Shay (1882–1961) and Teresa Cecelia Eason Shay (1890–1975) were married
in 1911 and moved to this farm the following year.  During their fifty years together here they raised four daughters.  They hired the Des Moines architectural firm of Kraetsch & Kraetsch to design this house.  It was constructed from 1919 to 1920.  A fire in one of the farm buildings in August 1920 did some damage to the structure before it was completed.  It was listed on the National Register of Historic Places in 1986.

It exhibits elements that are consistent with the Tudor Revival style. Houses like this one are more commonly found in an urban area. Its farmstead location reflects Iowa's rural prosperity at the end of what is known as the "Golden Age of Agriculture."

References

Houses completed in 1920
Buildings and structures in Ringgold County, Iowa
National Register of Historic Places in Ringgold County, Iowa
Houses on the National Register of Historic Places in Iowa